Neurolipa randiella is a moth of the family Gracillariidae which is found in Florida in the United States.

The wingspan is 5.8-6.1 mm.

The larvae feed on Randia aculeata. They mine the leaves of their host plants, leaving trumpet-shaped upperside blotches along leaf edges. When fresh, mined sites are not very discolored, but, as time passes, they become whitish brown.

References

Gracillariinae